Da’at Miqra is a series of volumes of Hebrew-language biblical commentary published by the Jerusalem-based Mossad Harav Kook and constitutes a cornerstone of contemporary Israeli Orthodox bible scholarship. The project was headed by Yehuda Kiel, who received the Israel Prize for his part in the enterprise.

Overview
The singularity of Da’at Miqra lies in its combination of a traditional outlook and the findings of modern research.  The Da’at Miqra editors have sought to present an interpretation based primarily upon Peshat — the direct, literal reading of the text — as opposed to Drash.  They do so by incorporating geographic references, archaeological findings and textual analysis, presenting a clear link between the commentary's traditional approach and contemporary methodology.  There has been some suggestion that the Da’at Miqra‘s dualistic approach reflects an underlying polemic against biblical criticism, without directly addressing the views and queries of bible critics but via a commentary aimed at debunking their methodology. 

Editors of the series include  Yehuda Elitzur of Bar-Ilan University, the International Bible Contest champion and Bible scholar Amos Hakham,  Sha’ul Yisra’eli and  Mordechai Breuer.

Methodology and structure
Da’at Miqra relies upon the Aleppo Codex for its basic text.  The commentary includes clarifications of difficult words and etymological references—particularly with regard to the names of locations mentioned—and contains various notes aimed at demonstrating, expanding upon or presenting alternate views on the text.  Each book of the Tanakh is divided into parts, each of which is preceded by a description of the chapter’s division and literary style and a general explanation of the portion.  In addition, each book contains a general introduction aimed at clarifying general issues within the text, such as the dating of its authorship, its historical background, parallels to other biblical books, an explanation of various repeating phrases or personas, and the like.

References

External links 
Meir Bar-Ilan's review of the Da'at Miqra CD-ROM edition (Hebrew)
 Michael Avioz, "The Da'at Mikra Commentary Series: Between Tradition and Criticism", Jewish Bible Quarterly 34 (2006), pp. 226-236. Online copy at https://www.academia.edu
Hebrew Bible studies
Orthodox Judaism